Georges Firmenich (born 3 December 1913, date of death unknown) was a Swiss sailor. He competed in the 6 Metre event at the 1936 Summer Olympics.

References

External links
 

1913 births
Year of death missing
Swiss male sailors (sport)
Olympic sailors of Switzerland
Sailors at the 1936 Summer Olympics – 6 Metre
Place of birth missing
20th-century Swiss people